I'm Against It may refer to:

 A track on album Road to Ruin by the Ramones
 A song sung by Groucho Marx in the film Horse Feathers